Tikhomorov is the heavily eroded remains of a lunar impact crater on the Moon's far side. It lies to the northeast of the smaller crater Konstantinov, and to the southwest of Trumpler.

This crater has been so heavily eroded by subsequent impacts that there is little to distinguish it from the nearby terrain. A slight depression in the surface and traces of the outer rim can be discerned, but it is otherwise identical to much of the remainder of the battered far side.

He crater is named after Nikolai Ivanovich Tikhomirov, a Russian Soviet chemical engineer and pioneer in rocket technology.

Satellite craters
By convention these features are identified on lunar maps by placing the letter on the side of the crater midpoint that is closest to Tikhomirov.

References

 
 
 
 
 
 
 
 
 
 
 
 

Impact craters on the Moon